Ron Fry (4 May 1937 – 24 January 1985) was  a former Australian rules footballer who played with Fitzroy in the Victorian Football League (VFL).

Saturday, 6 July 1963
On 6 July 1963, playing in the first ruck, he was a member of the young and inexperienced Fitzroy team that comprehensively and unexpectedly defeated Geelong, 9.13 (67) to 3.13 (31) in the 1963 Miracle Match.

See also
 1963 Miracle Match

Notes

References

External links 		
 		
 			
			
		
		
1937 births		
1985 deaths		
Australian rules footballers from Tasmania		
Fitzroy Football Club players
Penguin Football Club players